Bjørn Lyng (8 July 1925 – 12 October 2006) was a Norwegian businessman, investor and industrialist. He was the founder of Lyng Gruppen AS, a holding company with over twenty  subsidiaries. He is also associated with his development of vacation resorts located in Arguineguín along the south coast of Gran Canaria in the Canary Islands.

Biography
He was born at Hurum in Buskerud and grew up at Leksvik in Nord-Trøndelag. He was the son of farmer Hagbart Hartmann Lyng (1877- 1961) and nurse Helene Charlotte Steffens (1897-1960).  He was a cousin of  Norwegian Prime Minister John Lyng and of ethnographer Thor Heyerdahl. During the German occupation of Norway he joined the resistance movement, and was arrested in 1944 and incarcerated at Vollan, Falstad and Grini. Both his parents were also imprisoned by the Nazis and held at Falstad for almost a year.

In 1947 he established  Mekaniske Verksted, an iron foundry in Vanvikan  and Trøndelag Emaljeverk in Rissa. In 1968,  he started  Lyng Industrier AS, a plastic pipe factory in Leksvik. He started Elsafe International in 1978 at Mosvik  which eventually merged with VingCard to form VingCard Elsafe (now part of Assa Abloy). Lyng Electronics was founded in 1985 at Leksvik, but later moved to Vanvikan. In 1988, he founded the Anfi Group  which developed the resorts Anfi del Mar  and  Anfi Tauro Gran Canaria in the Canary Islands.

Honors
He was decorated Knight, First Class of the Order of St. Olav in 1985, and was an honorary citizen of the Canary Islands.

References

External links
Anfi website
Lyng website

1926 births
2006 deaths
People from Hurum
Norwegian company founders
Norwegian resistance members
Vollan concentration camp survivors
Falstad concentration camp survivors
Grini concentration camp survivors
Recipients of the St. Olav's Medal